Voorhees is an unincorporated community and census-designated place (CDP) located in Franklin Township, in Somerset County, New Jersey, United States. As of the 2010 United States Census, the CDP's population was 1,959.

Geography
According to the United States Census Bureau, Voorhees had a total area of 0.718 square miles (1.860 km2), all of which was land.

Demographics

Census 2010

References

Census-designated places in Somerset County, New Jersey
Franklin Township, Somerset County, New Jersey